Phosphaenus hemipterus, the short-winged firefly or lesser glow worm, is a beetle in the monotypic genus Phosphaenus and the family Lampyridae. It is found in the Mediterranean, in Central Europe, west to the Atlantic Ocean and north to the edge of Scandinavia and in England. In North America, the species has been introduced. It inhabits meadows, floodplains, forest edges, and dry slopes, but also parks and gardens. In Britain, this species is fairly rare compared to the common glow-worm (Lampyris noctiluca).

Description
The body is dark brown and has a reddish tinge. The males have greatly shortened wing covers and unlike other fireflies are similar to the female. Their membranous wings are reduced, which is why they resemble the flightless females.

The larvae are similar to those of Lampyris noctiluca, but they lack the bilateral series of reddish dots on the abdomen, and they are a little darker and brighter coloured, slender in build and smaller.

References

Lampyridae
Beetles of Europe
Bioluminescent insects
Beetles described in 1762
Monotypic Elateriformia genera